Orlando Contreras may refer to:
Orlando Contreras (singer) (1930–1994), Cuban singer
Orlando Contreras (footballer) (born 1982), Peruvian football player